In molecular biology, the cohesin domain is a protein domain. It interacts with a complementary domain, termed the dockerin domain. The cohesin-dockerin interaction is the crucial interaction for complex formation in the cellulosome.

The scaffolding component of the cellulolytic bacterium Clostridium thermocellum is a non-hydrolytic protein which organises the hydrolytic enzymes into a large complex, called the cellulosome. Scaffoldin comprises a series of functional domains, amongst which is a single cellulose-binding domain and nine cohesin domains which are responsible for integrating the individual enzymatic subunits into the complex.

References

External links

Protein domains